Linga is an Indian actor who has appeared in Tamil language films. After making his film debut in the Tamil film Chennai Ungalai Anbudan Varaverkirathu (2015), he has been in films including Sindhubaadh (2019),  Parole (2022) and recently Udanpaal (2022).

Career
Linga's first major role came in Arun Kumar's Sethupathi (2016), where he portrayed a police officer supporting Vijay Sethupathi's character in his investigation. Linga portrayed the main antagonist in Arun Kumar's Sindhubaadh (2019), appearing as Bangkok-based gangster in the human trafficking business. The film opened to mixed reviews, with a critic from FirstPost noting that his character was "underwritten".

Linga portrayed a pivotal role in Penguin (2020), appearing as the lead actress Keerthy Suresh's husband. In 2022, Linga played a lead role, alongside R. S. Karthik, in Dwarakh Raja's crime thriller Parole. He also featured in the lead role in Udanpaal, headlining an ensemble cast of actors such as Charle, Gayathrie and Vivek Prasanna.

Filmography

Television series
 Ayali (2023)
 Story of Things (2023)
 Iru Dhuruvam 2 (2023)

References

External links

Indian film actors
Tamil actors
Living people
Actors in Tamil cinema
Year of birth missing (living people)
21st-century Indian actors
Male actors in Tamil cinema